Zackary Lowell Stentz is an American writer and producer of film and television, journalist, novelist, and teacher, best known for his work on Marvel properties with former writing partner Ashley Edward Miller.

Career
Stentz graduated from UC Santa Cruz with a degree in journalism. As a journalist, he wrote and edited for publications such as The Economist, Esquire, Sports Illustrated, and Entertainment Weekly. In addition, he was an environmental activist for Earth First! in the early 1990s.

After graduating from UC Santa Cruz with a degree in Journalism, he worked for Metro Silicon Valley, writing about television, books and popular culture, as well as the Sonoma County Independent (now the North Bay Bohemian)
 In 1997, publisher Dan Pulcrano tapped Stentz to oversee Metro's rebranding and launch of its San Francisco monthly, The Metropolitan.

After turning to screenwriting full-time, from 2000 to 2015 he worked with writing partner Ashley Edward Miller, beginning with Gene Roddenberry's Andromeda. As a team, they co-wrote the films X-Men: First Class, the Marvel Cinematic Universe film Thor, and Agent Cody Banks.

He and Miller did some of the initial work on the project that became Top Gun: Maverick, a sequel to the 1986 Tom Cruise film, Top Gun, releasing in 2021.

As writer and producer, he is currently in post-production on the Netflix science fiction adventure film Rim of the World, directed by McG.

He has written and produced multiple television programs, including Gene Roddenberry's Andromeda, The CW's The Flash, Fox's Fringe, and Fox's Terminator: The Sarah Connor Chronicles. He also created and developed a forthcoming animated show based on a popular franchise for DreamWorks, Universal, and Netflix.

He has several projects in development, including television programs for Skydance Television, Warner Bros., and HBO, as well as the DC superhero film Booster Gold at Warner Bros. and a remake of Big Trouble in Little China at Fox.

Additionally, he co-wrote the acclaimed young adult novel Colin Fischer, and is currently writing an adventure/thriller entitled Nevermore.

He also teaches screenwriting in the United States and in China. He was  a guest of the Wutianming Foundation in Tianjin, and of Wanda Studios in Beijing, where he taught young Chinese screenwriters the tricks and techniques of writing American action movies.

Personal life
A native of Fort Bragg, California, Stentz was born to a father of German and Irish descent and a mother of Lebanese descent and has described himself as half-Lebanese. His daughter is autistic, and Stentz himself has been described as exhibiting symptoms of the condition.

Filmography
Film writer
 Agent Cody Banks (2003)
 Thor (2011)
 X-Men: First Class (2011)
 Rim of the World (2019) (Also producer)

Television writer

Bibliography

References

External links

Living people
Place of birth missing (living people)
Year of birth missing (living people)
People from Fort Bragg, California
American television writers
Screenwriters from California
Television producers from California
American male television writers
American male screenwriters
21st-century American male writers
21st-century American screenwriters
American writers of Lebanese descent
Screenwriting instructors